The Child (Anak) is a 2000 Filipino family drama film directed by Rory Quintos starring Vilma Santos and Claudine Barretto, with Joel Torre and Baron Geisler. The film was critically acclaimed by film critics. It was the Philippines' submission to the 73rd Academy Awards for the Academy Award for Best Foreign Language Film, but was not accepted as a nominee.

The film has been restored by ABS-CBN Film Archives. The restored version premiered on ABS-CBN's movie channel, Cinema One, on May 22, 2015.

Vilma Santos and Claudine Barretto were very fond throughout filming. In addition to this film the film also sets the tone on a ofw mother and her struggle to see her children grow up hoping for them a better future. Throughout the film there is a popular discussion about family life, and the importance of relationships, communication, and relationships personal needs

Plot
A woman struggling to make a better life for her family finds that her efforts have caused a problem between her and her children in this downbeat family drama. Josie is a mother of three children (Carla, Michael, and Daday) from the Philippines who takes a job in Hong Kong as a nanny for a wealthy couple for several years. She knows she can make more money in Hong Kong than she could at home, but also has qualms about how her absence will affect her children, especially when her husband died not long after she left. When Josie returns home, she has gifts for everyone and savings from her salary, which she plans to use to start a business. Her children, however, don't welcome their mother with open arms. The younger kids, Daday and Michael, are guarded around Josie, and while they eventually mend their relationship with their mother, the oldest, Carla, does nothing to disguise her resentment for what she sees as callous abandonment of her family. Carla openly challenges Josie's authority, starts dating boys she knows her mother wouldn't approve of, flaunts her burgeoning sexuality, begins using drugs, and has multiple abortions.

In the end, Carla realized what she has done and understands the reason why her mother didn't return home at the death of her father. She forgives her and changes her ways, and promises to take care of her younger siblings when she went back to Hong Kong.

Cast
Vilma Santos as Josie Agbisit
Claudine Barretto as Carla
Joel Torre as Rudy
Baron Geisler as Michael
Sheila Mae Alvero as Daday
Amy Austria as Lyn
Cherry Pie Picache as Mercy
Leandro Muñoz as Brian
Jodi Santamaria as Bernadette
Tess Dumpit as Norma
Cris Michelena as Arnel
Hazel Ann Mendoza as Young Carla
Daniel Morial as Young Michael
Gino Paul Guzman as Don Don
Odette Khan as Mrs. Madrid
Jiro Manio as Jason
Don Laurel as Lester

Accolades

See also

Cinema of the Philippines

References

External links

2000 films
2000 drama films
Films about Filipino families
Films directed by Rory Quintos
Films shot in Hong Kong
Star Cinema films